The 2019 Tour de l'Avenir was the 56th edition of the Tour de l'Avenir, a UCI 2.NCup stage race for riders aged 23 or younger. The  race consisted of 10 stages. It started on 15 August in Marmande and concluded on 25 August in La Corbière, with Norwegian Tobias Foss winning the general classification.

Race overview

A total of 153 riders, from 26 teams participated in the race. There were 23 national teams, two regional teams, and one international team. The Canadian team competed at the event for the first time in eight years. The event consisted of mostly hilly and mountainous stages, with one rest day between stages 6 and 7. Stage 2 of the race was a team time trial.

British rider Ethan Hayter won stage 3, before withdrawing from the race after breaking his collarbone on the fourth stage. Fellow British cyclist Fred Wright won the fourth stage. Healy is an Irish rider, who was competing for the International team. Swiss cyclist Stefan Bissegger won the sixth stage. Briton Tom Pidcock withdrew from the race after crashing within the final  of the stage. Stage 8 of the race included an ascent of the Col de la Loze, the seventh highest mountain pass in France. It was the first time that the mountain had been part of a professional cycle race. The route up the Col de la Loze started in the valley and involved a direct descent of the mountain. The stage was won by Australia's Alexander Evans. Hungary's Attila Valter won the ninth stage despite momentarily going the wrong way near to the finish. Going into Stage 10, Norway's Tobias Foss held a lead of 1:10. He managed to hold onto his race lead, finishing seventh at the summit of Le Corbier.

Route and stages

Classifications
Norwegian cyclist Tobias Foss won the general classification, ahead of Italian Giovanni Aleotti, and Belgian Ilan Van Wilder. Foss was the first Norwegian to win the race. American cyclist Matteo Jorgenson won the points classification, ahead of Foss and Mathias Norsgaard. Spanish rider Jon Agirre won the mountains classification ahead of Alexander Evans and Michel Ries.

References

External links
 

2019
2019 UCI Europe Tour
2019 in French sport
August 2019 sports events in France